Accolade is a 1950 play by the Welsh playwright Emlyn Williams. Accolade  was first presented in London by H. M. Tennent Ltd, in association with Leland Hayward and Joshua Logan, at the Aldwych Theatre, on 7 September 1950, with Emlyn Williams as Will Trenting and a cast including Diana Churchill, Anthony Nicholls, Dora Bryan, John Cavanah and Noel Willman. It ran for 180 performances. It was revived in 2011 at the Finborough Theatre and the cast included Graham Seed, Aden Gillett and Saskia Wickham

References

Bibliography
 Wearing, J.P. The London Stage 1950-1959: A Calendar of Productions, Performers, and Personnel.  Rowman & Littlefield, 2014.

External links
http://www.ft.com/cms/s/2/a2463046-33a4-11e0-b1ed-00144feabdc0.html#axzz1Dx5lP1C3
https://www.independent.co.uk/arts-entertainment/theatre-dance/reviews/greenland-nt-lyttelton-londonbrless-than-kind-jermyn-street-londonbraccolade-finborough-london-2205533.html

1950 plays
Plays by Emlyn Williams
West End plays
Plays set in London